Criorhina takaoensis is a species of hoverfly in the family Syrphidae.

Distribution
Japan.

References

Eristalinae
Diptera of Asia
Insects described in 1952